Purmo is a former municipality of Finland. It was incorporated into the rural municipality of Pedersöre (currently the municipality of Pedersöre) in Ostrobothnia in 1977. Purmo is home to a wooden church built by Antti Hakola in 1772. Approximately 1,400 people live in Purmo and like in Pedersöre, they are mainly Swedish-speaking.

The Purmo Group, a manufacturing firm, was founded in Purmo in 1953.

Villages
Nederpurmo 
Överpurmo
Åvist
Lillby

Name 
According to Lars Huldén, the name of Purmo may come from the Finnish words puro (stream) and maa (land) or from a North Karelian surname, Purmonen. Other possibilities include a common origin with Purmoniemi, a peninsula in Evijärvi and Purmonsaari, a hill in Lappajärvi; as well as a relation to the South Ostrobothnian dialectal word purmu referring to a pit for storing beets during the winter.

History 
Purmo was first mentioned as a village within the Pedersöre parish in 1543. It became a chapel community in 1771 and an independent parish and municipality in 1867.

Purmo was merged back into Pedersöre in 1977.

References 

Villages in Finland
Former municipalities of Finland
Pedersöre